Workenesh Tola (born 11 October 1980) is an Ethiopian long-distance runner. She competed in the women's marathon at the 2004 Summer Olympics.

References

1980 births
Living people
Athletes (track and field) at the 2004 Summer Olympics
Ethiopian female long-distance runners
Ethiopian female marathon runners
Olympic athletes of Ethiopia
Place of birth missing (living people)